"The Rest of Our Life" is a song recorded by American country music artists Tim McGraw and Faith Hill. The song was written by Steve Mac, Johnny McDaid, Ed Sheeran and Amy Wadge.

Background
The song is the title track of McGraw and Hill's duets album The Rest of Our Life, and it was written by Ed Sheeran together with Amy Wadge, Johnny McDaid and Steve Mac.  According to Faith Hill, the song reminded her of the day when she and Tim McGraw decided to get married after meeting McGraw on his Spontaneous Combustion tour in 1996, when she first heard the song, and said that "there was a comfort and a security about that moment that resonates in this song." McGraw concurred and said: "It's got such an intimacy to the song, and I think that's what really attracted us as well."

The song was first released on October 5, 2017, prior to release of the album on November 17 as the second single of the album.

Commercial performance
When the song was released in October 2017, the song sold 18,000 copies in its first week, allowing the song to debut on the Hot Country Songs chart at No. 25. It debuted on Country Airplay the previous week at No. 51 on the chart date of October 21, 2017. The song has sold 143,000 copies in the United States as of March 2018.

Allegations of plagiarism
McGraw and Hill, as well as the writers of the song, were sued by Sean Carey and Beau Golden on allegations that it is a "blatant copying" of their song "When I Found You" recorded and co-written by Australian artist Jasmine Rae. The lawsuit asks for an injunction, at least $5 million in damages, royalties and attorney fees.

Charts

Weekly charts

Year-end charts

References

2017 songs
2017 singles
Tim McGraw songs
Faith Hill songs
Arista Nashville singles
Songs written by Steve Mac
Songs written by Johnny McDaid
Songs written by Ed Sheeran
Songs written by Amy Wadge
Song recordings produced by Byron Gallimore
Song recordings produced by Tim McGraw
Male–female vocal duets